Ayodhya is a 1975 Indian Malayalam-language film, directed by P. N. Sundaram and produced by Pavamani. The film stars Prem Nazir, Raghavan, Adoor Bhasi, Sankaradi and Sreelatha Namboothiri. It is a remake of the Telugu film Samsaram.

Plot

Cast 

Prem Nazir as Narayanan
Adoor Bhasi as M. K. Muthalali
Sankaradi as Sarasamma
Sreelatha Namboothiri
Raghavan as Madhavankutty
Bahadoor as Jayaraman
K. R. Vijaya as Lakshmi
Meena as Jayaraman's Mother
Rani Chandra as Kamalam
Master Raghu as Gopi
 Manavalan Joseph
 T. S. Muthaiah
 Paravoor Bharathan
 Krishnadas
 T.R Omana
 Philomina
 Shobha
 Baby Santhi
 Kedamangalam Ali
 Ragava Menon
 Suresh

Soundtrack 
The music was composed by G. Devarajan, with lyrics by P. Bhaskaran.

References

External links 
 

1975 films
1970s Malayalam-language films
Malayalam remakes of Telugu films